Claymont Hill, also known as the Albert L. Hendrix House, is a historic home located near Ronda, Wilkes County, North Carolina. It was built in 1870, and is a large two-story, ell-shaped I-house with multiple gables and with two-story porches on three elevations. At its core is a much earlier log structure. It has Gothic Revival style design elements in the gables and sawnwork trim.  Also on the property is a contributing former detached kitchen.

It was listed on the National Register of Historic Places in 1985.

References

Houses on the National Register of Historic Places in North Carolina
Gothic Revival architecture in North Carolina
Houses completed in 1870
Houses in Wilkes County, North Carolina
National Register of Historic Places in Wilkes County, North Carolina